Little Man was an American tribal leader of Cheyenne ancestry.

Little Man was the son of Stone Forehead's sister and thus the cousin of Black Hairy Dog. At the latter's death, circa.1883, Little Man succeeded him as Keeper. His father Turtle Following His Wife and his mother Running Face along with his brother White Beaver.

Like his family of the arrows he too possessed Spirit Lodge power to an unusual degree. Little Man, Keeper of the Arrows  reigned during a time when the Cheyenne was in build. He was considered a traditionalist, and opposed the Indian Agent on a regular basis. In 1901, the agent threatened to cut off rations if Little Man did not send the children to the Indian schools.

In 1914, Little Man  attempted to turn the Keeper's responsibility over to Old Crow. The transfer was refused by the Chiefs, the Arrow priest and the leaders of the military societies. They held fast to Sweet Medicine's rule that the Arrow Keeper must be Tsistsistas, but on request Little Man permitted peyote to be placed in the Sacred Arrow Bundle, soon died in 1917. Thus silencing decades of loyalty, generations of guardianship and centuries of keepers of his royal bloodline.

Guardians and Priests of the Arrows soon shifted to a new Keeper, but an unlikely era. Little Man's sons to young to take leadership, soon taken away by the white man.

See also
Medicine Arrows

References 

Cheyenne people